The 1984 Australian federal election was held in Australia on 1 December 1984. All 148 seats in the House of Representatives (24 of them newly created) and 46 of 76 seats in the Senate (12 of them newly created) were up for election. The incumbent Labor Party led by Prime Minister Bob Hawke defeated the opposition Liberal–National coalition, led by Andrew Peacock.

The election was held in conjunction with two referendum questions, neither of which was carried.

Background and issues
The election had a long campaign and a high rate of informal voting for the House of Representatives, but decreased rate in the Senate (due to the introduction of the Group voting ticket). The election was held 18 months ahead of time, partly to bring the elections for the House of Representatives and Senate back into line following the double dissolution election of 1983.

The legislated increase in the size of the House of Representatives by 24 seats and the Senate by 12 seats came into effect at the 1984 election. Prior to 1984 the electoral commission did not undertake a full distribution of preferences for statistical purposes. The stored ballot papers for the previous election were put through this process prior to their destruction – therefore the figures from 1983 onwards show the actual result based on full distribution of preferences.

Results

House of Representatives

Senate

Seats changing hands

 Members listed in italics did not contest their seat at this election.

Analysis

The results of the election surprised most analysts; the expectation had been that Bob Hawke – who had been polling a record ACNielsen approval rating of 75 percent on the eve of the election – would win by a significantly larger margin. Labor instead suffered a 2-point swing against it and had its majority cut from 25 to 16. Hawke blamed the result on the changes to Senate vote cards, which he believed confused people regarding their House of Representatives votes and contributed to the relatively high informal vote, the majority of which apparently was Labor votes. Andrew Peacock did well from a good performance in the one leaders' debate, held on 26 November 1984. This was the first televised leaders' debate in Australia.

See also
 Candidates of the 1984 Australian federal election
 Members of the Australian House of Representatives, 1984-1987
 Members of the Australian Senate, 1985-1987

References

University of WA  election results in Australia since 1890
AEC 2PP vote
AustralianPolitics.com election details

1984 elections in Australia
Bob Hawke
Federal elections in Australia
December 1984 events in Australia